John Morgan (November 11, 1967 – October 6, 2021) was the Oliver E. Williamson and Dolores J. Williamson Chair in the Economics of Organizations at the University of California, Berkeley.

He was the founding director of the U.C. Berkeley Experimental Social Sciences Laboratory (Xlab). He was a member of the editorial board of the California Management Review since 2003. He was the faculty leader of the Center for Executive Education at UC Berkeley.

Life
Morgan was born on November 11, 1967 in Wilkes-Barre, Pennsylvania. He received his B.S. in economics summa cum laude in 1989 from Wharton School of the University of Pennsylvania and Ph.D. in 1996 from Pennsylvania State University.  His Ph.D. dissertation, entitled Essays on Auctions, Lotteries, and Contracts, was written under the supervision of  Vijay Krishna, Professor of Economics Penn State University.

He worked with Bankruptcy and Forensic Accounting Group, Grant Thornton International, from 1989 to 1992, and as Assistant Professor of Economics and Public Affairs, Princeton University from 1996 to 2002. He was also a visiting professor at Pennsylvania State University, New York University, Stanford University, University of Cambridge and University of Oxford.

Morgan died on October 6, 2021 in Walnut Creek, California.

Awards and honors
 W. Glenn Campbell and Rita Ricardo-Campbell National Fellowship, 2001–2002.
 Oliver E. Williamson Award, Haas School of Business, 2014

Selected articles and publications

 Information Gatekeepers on the Internet and the Competitiveness of Homogeneous Product Markets  (with Michael Baye), American Economic Review, 91 (2001), 454–74.
 A model of expertise  V Krishna, J Morgan - The Quarterly Journal of Economics, 2001.
 Voluntary voting: Costs and benefits, (with Vijay Krishna), Published: November 2012  Journal of Economic Theory, 2012, 147(6), pp. 2083–2123.
An analysis of stock recommendations  J Morgan, PC Stocken - RAND Journal of economics, 2003.

References

External links
 Voted Off The Island At Berkeley Haas  
 Invitation to Scott Adams 

1967 births
2021 deaths
University of California, Berkeley faculty
Pennsylvania State University alumni
People from Wilkes-Barre, Pennsylvania
Economists from Pennsylvania
21st-century American economists